Tripping Up the Stairs is the second studio album by Canadian folk rock group Spirit of the West, released in July 1986 by Stony Plain Records. 

"The Crawl" is an enduring fan favourite at the band's concerts.

J. Knutson left the band after this album. He was replaced by Hugh McMillan.

The band recorded at least one other song with producer Paul Hyde, "Think About It", which has never appeared on any album or single. However, a live performance video of the song aired in occasional rotation on MuchMusic throughout the decade and into the 1990s.

Track listing
Lyrics and music are credited to the band members: John Mann, Geoffrey Kelly and J. Knutson. As with all of the band's early folk albums, several songs are arranged around traditional Irish and Scottish jigs and reels.

"An Honest Gamble" – 4:32 (Jig: "Tripping Up the Stairs")
"Our Station"  – 3:34
"Peacetime"  – 4:10
"Room Without a View (Stella)"  – 4:00
"The Crawl"  – 4:00
"Homelands" – 3:57 (Jigs: "The Kesh", "The Blackthorn Stick")
"The Mists of Crofton"  – 3:00
"Till the Cows Come Home"  – 2:56
"When Rivers Rise"  – 3:56
"Be Right" – 5:15 (Reel: "Pigeon on the Gate")

Personnel
Musicians
 Jack Duncan – congas
 Geoff Kelly – Bodhrán, flute, vocals
 J. Knutson – bass, bouzouki, guitar, mandolin, vocals
 Anne Leader – keyboards
 John Mann – guitar, vocals
 Barry Muir – fretless bass

Other credits
 Deb Dacombe – photography
 Paul Hyde – producer
 Tom Obburn – design, illustrations
 Ron Obvious – engineer, mixing

References

1986 albums
Spirit of the West albums
Stony Plain Records albums